Paul Kirsten (born 30 October 1969) is a former South African first-class cricketer. He is the brother of Gary Kirsten and half brother of Peter Kirsten and Andrew Kirsten.

External links

1969 births
Living people
South African cricketers
Border cricketers
Griqualand West cricketers
Western Province cricketers
Alumni of Rondebosch Boys' High School
Wicket-keepers